Hayborough is a north-eastern suburb of the South Australian town of Victor Harbor, located on the south coast of Fleurieu Peninsula.

The suburb contains a pharmacy, a child care centre and a small shopping centre, and is serviced by a bus service offered by Stateliner that connects the Adelaide city centre to Goolwa and Victor Harbor.

On 7 June 2018, the suburb of Hayborough was split along the existing council boundary with the part to the east in the Alexandrina Council becoming the new suburb of Chiton, and the Victor Harbor side in the west retaining the name Hayborough.

References

Towns in South Australia